St Baradates (died circa 460) was a hermit who lived in the Diocese of Cyrrhus in Syria, and whose bishop, Theodoret, called him "the admirable Baradates."

Baradates lived in a tiny hut, too small for him to stand upright, and he wore a leather garment that exposed only his mouth and nose.  He was said to have been very learned, particularly in theology.  Emperor Leo wrote him, asking his advice regarding the Council of Chalcedon.
In the Roman Catholic Church, as well as the Eastern Orthodox Churches, the Feast of St Baradates is February 22.

Monks of Ramsgate account

The monks of St Augustine's Abbey, Ramsgate wrote in their Book of Saints (1921),

Butler's account

The hagiographer Alban Butler (1710–1773) wrote in his Lives of the Fathers, Martyrs, and Other Principal Saints under February 22,

Notes

Citations

Sources

 
 

Syrian Christian saints
Hermits
460 deaths